is a Japanese footballer currently playing as a goalkeeper for YSCC Yokohama.

Career statistics

Club
.

Notes

References

External links

1993 births
Living people
Japanese footballers
Association football goalkeepers
J3 League players
YSCC Yokohama players